Bongolo (also known as Bongolo and the Negro Princess) is a 1952 Belgian film directed by André Cauvin. It was entered into the 1953 Cannes Film Festival.

Plot
A young Congolese man works as a nurse at a health center lost in the jungle. He falls in love with the daughter of the local king and convinces her to forget her prejudices and ancestral rites. The elders, who oppose the wedding, burn down the health center.

Cast
 Petronelle Abapataki as Doka
 Peter Baylis as Comments
 Yves Furet as (voice)
 Joseph Lifela as Bongolo
 Sonar Senghor as (voice)

References

External links

1952 films
Belgian drama films
1950s French-language films
Films directed by André Cauvin